Gibraltar is a census-designated place (CDP) in northern Robeson Township in southern Berks County, Pennsylvania, United States. Its population was 680 as of the 2010 census. The community is four miles from Birdsboro and 6.4 miles from downtown Reading. It is served by the Twin Valley School District and is across the Schuylkill River from Exeter.

Demographics

History
The town is named after Gibraltar, which is south of Spain.
In the mid-18th Century, prior to being named Gibraltar, the place was known as Seideltown. Descendants of Ernst Seidel (an emigrant from Sweden) operated ironworks (forges) in that area.

Education
The school district is Twin Valley School District.

Twin Valley Middle School and Twin Valley High School are in Caernarvon Township, Berks County, and have Elverson postal addresses.

Notes

Census-designated places in Berks County, Pennsylvania
Populated places on the Schuylkill River